MicroRNA 494 is a microRNA sequence which is encoded in humans by the MIR494 gene.

Function 

MicroRNAs (miRNAs) are short (20–24 nucleotides) non-coding RNAs which are involved in post-transcriptional regulation of gene expression in multicellular organisms by affecting both the stability and translation of mRNAs. miRNAs are transcribed by RNA polymerase II as part of capped and polyadenylated primary transcripts (pri-miRNAs) that can be either protein-coding or non-coding. The primary transcript is cleaved by the Drosha ribonuclease III enzyme to produce an approximately 70-nucleotide stem-loop precursor miRNA (pre-miRNA), which is further cleaved by the cytoplasmic Dicer ribonuclease to generate the mature miRNA and antisense miRNA* ("mi-RNA star") products. The mature miRNA is incorporated into an RNA-induced silencing complex (RISC), which recognises target miRNAs through imperfect base pairing with the miRNA and most commonly results in translational inhibition or destabilisation of the target mRNA. This RefSeq represents the predicted microRNA stem-loop.

References

Further reading